Luis Iruretagoyena Aiestarán (21 June 1907 – 19 October 1965), known as Kiriki, was a Spanish footballer who played as a forward. He competed in the men's tournament at the 1928 Summer Olympics.

References

External links
 

1907 births
1965 deaths
People from Zarautz
Association football forwards
Spanish footballers
Spain international footballers
Olympic footballers of Spain
Footballers at the 1928 Summer Olympics
Footballers from the Basque Country (autonomous community)
La Liga players
Real Sociedad footballers